The dadio (Laubuka dadiburjori) is a cyprinid fish, is rarely seen in the aquarist hobby but is not entirely unlike the Danio nigrofasciatus in appearance. Laubuka dadiburjori is a gold/silver fish with a blue line, it has two colour morphs, one with a distinct blue line, the other with a dotted blue line. Barbels are not present. Like most Danionins, this fish has a tendency to jump. A tight fitting lid with no gaps is recommended. Endemic in India, where both colour morphs co-exist, the fish is found from Tamil Nadu to Goa. It is necessary to avoid making it coexist with big fish which would only make a mouthful of it (killi: panchax, melanoteania boesmani…).

References

Danios
Laubuka
Fish of India
Endemic fauna of the Western Ghats
Fish described in 1952